Groupe 1981 (from 1992 until 2010 Groupe Start then from 2010 until 2013 Sud Radio Groupe) is a French company established in 1992
which engages in radio publishing and is based in Orléans, France.

History

In 1992, the Start Group is founded by Jean-Éric Vailli.

In 2010, the Start Group changes its name to become Sud Radio Groupe, named after the Sud Radio radio station.

On December 11, 2013, the group renamed itself Groupe 1981 following the sale of Sud Radio.

Radio stations
 Black Box
 Forum
 Latina
 Oüi FM
 Ado FM
 Vibration
 Voltage
 Wit FM

References

Radio broadcasting companies of France
Mass media companies established in 1992
Companies based in Centre-Val de Loire
Mass media in Orléans